Thomas Vigner Christiansen Haaland (29 August 1859 - 15 July 1913) was a Norwegian politician.

Born in Torvestad, he worked as a banker and ship-owner for the most of his career.

He was a member of Haugesund city council, serving as mayor in 1900, 1902, 1903 and 1910. He served as a deputy representative to the Norwegian Parliament during the term 1904–1906, representing the Moderate Liberal Party, and in 1907–1909 for the Coalition Party.

References

1859 births
1913 deaths
Deputy members of the Storting
Mayors of places in Rogaland
Moderate Liberal Party politicians
Coalition Party (Norway) politicians
Norwegian bankers
People from Haugesund